Malaysia competed at the 2004 Summer Olympics in Athens, Greece, from 13 to 29 August 2004. This was the nation's twelfth appearance at the Olympics, although it had previously competed in two other games under the name Malaya. Malaysia, however, did not participate at the 1980 Summer Olympics in Moscow, because of its partial support to the United States boycott.

With the absence of the men's field hockey team, Olympic Council of Malaysia sent the nation's smallest delegation to the Games since the 1992 Summer Olympics in Barcelona. A total of 26 athletes, 18 men and 8 women, competed in 11 sports. Nine Malaysian athletes had previously competed in Sydney, including badminton tandem Choong Tan Fook and Lee Wan Wah, race walker Yuan Yufang, and US-based swimmers Alex Lim and Allen Ong. Being the youngest ever athlete of the team, fourteen-year-old diver Bryan Nickson Lomas was appointed by the council to become the nation's flag bearer in the opening ceremony. Malaysia also marked its official debut in archery.

Malaysia failed to win a single Olympic medal for the second consecutive time since the 1996 Summer Olympics in Atlanta, where badminton pair Cheah Soon Kit and Yap Kim Hock claimed a silver in the men's doubles.

Archery

One Malaysian archer qualified for the women's individual archery.

Athletics

Malaysian athletes have so far achieved qualifying standards in the following athletics events (up to a maximum of 3 athletes in each event at the 'A' Standard, and 1 at the 'B' Standard).

Men

Women

Badminton

Men

Women

Cycling

Track
Sprint

Keirin

Diving

Malaysian divers qualified for four individual spots at the 2004 Olympic Games.

Men

Women

Gymnastics

Artistic
Men

Sailing

Malaysian sailors have qualified one boat for each of the following events.

Open

M = Medal race; OCS = On course side of the starting line; DSQ = Disqualified; DNF = Did not finish; DNS= Did not start; RDG = Redress given

Shooting

Two Malaysian shooters qualified to compete in the following events:

Men

Swimming

Malaysian swimmers earned qualifying standards in the following events (up to a maximum of 2 swimmers in each event at the A-standard time, and 1 at the B-standard time):

Men

Women

Taekwondo

Malaysia has qualified a single taekwondo jin.

Weightlifting

Malaysia has qualified a single weightlifter.

See also
 Malaysia at the 2002 Asian Games
 Malaysia at the 2004 Summer Paralympics

References

External links

 Official Report of the XXVIII Olympiad
 Olympic Council of Malaysia

Nations at the 2004 Summer Olympics
2004
Summer Olympics